The following is a list of awards, nominations and honours received by Tamannaah throughout her acting career.

Honours

Awards

Asianet Film Awards

Asiavision Awards

CineMAA Awards 
The CineMAA Awards  are presented annually by the Movie Artists Association Group to honour artistic and technical excellence of professionals in the Tollywood.

Dayawati Modi Global Awards

Filmfare Awards South 
The Filmfare Awards South is the South Indian segment of the annual Filmfare Awards, presented by The Times Group to honour artistic and technical excellence of professionals in the South Indian film industry.

Global Spa Fit & Fab Awards

Hyderabad Times Film Awards

IIFA Utsavam 
IIFA Utsavam are the South Indian segment of International Indian Film Academy Awards presented annually for the cinematic and music achievements in Tollywood & Telugu Music, Tamil cinema, Kannada cinema and Malayalam cinema.

Kalaimamani Awards 
The Kalaimamani is an award in Tamil Nadu state, India. These awards are given by the Tamil Nadu Iyal Isai Nataka Manram (literature, music and theatre) for excellence in the field of art and literature.

NRI of the year Awards

Santosham Film Awards 
The Santosham Film Awards are presented annually by the Santosham film magazine to honour artistic and technical excellence of professionals in the Tollywood and Telugu Music. They were started in 2004.

Saturn Awards

SIIMA Awards 
The South Indian International Movie Awards are presented annually by the Vibri Media Group to honour artistic and technical excellence of professionals in the Tollywood and Telugu Music.

South Scope

TSR - TV9 National Film Awards

Vijay Awards

Zee Apsara Awards

Zee Cine Awards

Zee Cinemalu Awards

Ranking

IMDb

Social Networks

Times of India

References

Tamannaah